Shogi is a two-player strategy board game in the same family as Western chess, chaturanga, and Chinese xiangqi, and is the most popular of a family of chess variants native to Japan.

Arrival in Japan 
It is not clear when the ancestral chess-type game that later developed into shogi was brought to Japan. There are tales that relate that it was invented by Yuwen Yong of Northern Zhou, and that  brought it back after visiting the country of Tang, but both these tales are likely to have been invented at the start of the Edo period by those keen to make a name for themselves as authorities on shogi.

There are several theories about when shogi spread to Japan, but the earliest plausible date is around the 6th century. It is thought that the pieces used in the shogi of the time were not the current five-sided pieces, but three-dimensional figures, as were used in chaturanga. This parallels the changes in chess pieces, which are more representational and less abstract than those made earlier. However, a large problem with this theory is that as pieces in this form have never been found, let alone stored in the treasury of Shōsōin, there is little physical evidence supporting it.

Another theory gives a later date, stating that shogi was brought to Japan after the start of the Nara period. However, serious doubts about this theory remain as these games are different from shogi – for example, in that pieces are placed on the intersections of lines. The games of makruk from Thailand and Cambodia and sittuyin from Myanmar have an elephant which moves in the same way as the silver general.  Sittuyin also has the practice of dropping pieces.  From the Song Dynasty through the Ming Dynasty, China sent great trade convoys through the southern islands and all around the Indian Ocean and also traded with Japan, so elements of South Asian chess could have reached Japan.

See also the history of chess.

Shogi in the Heian period 
(1058–1064), written by Fujiwara Akihira also has passages relating to shogi, and is regarded as the earliest document on the subject.

The oldest archaeological evidence is a group of 16 shogi pieces excavated from the grounds of Kōfuku-ji in Nara Prefecture, and as a wooden writing plaque written on in the sixth year of Tenki (1058) was found at the same time, the pieces are thought to be of the same period. The pieces of the time appear to have been simple ones made by cutting a writing plaque and writing directly on the surface, but they have the same five-sided shape as modern pieces. As "Shin Saru Gakuki", mentioned above, is of the same period, this find is backed up by documentary evidence.

So as not to confuse these with later types of shogi, in modern times these are called Heian shogi (or Heian small shogi) and Heian dai shogi. Heian shogi is the version on which modern shogi is based, but it is written that one wins if one's opponent is reduced to a single king, apparently indicating that at the time there was no concept of pieces in the hand.

The pieces used in these variants of shogi consist of those used in Heian shogi: the king, gold general, silver general, knight, lance, and pawn, and those used only in Heian great shogi: the copper general, iron general, side mover, tiger, flying dragon, free chariot and go between. According to Kōji Shimizu, chief researcher at the Archaeological Institute of Kashihara, Nara Prefecture, the names of the Heian shogi pieces keep those of chaturanga (general, elephant, horse, chariot and soldier), and add to them the five treasures of Buddhism (jewel, gold, silver, katsura tree, and incense). There is also a theory by Yoshinori Kimura that while chaturanga was from the start a game simulating war, and thus pieces were discarded once captured, Heian shogi involved pieces kept in the hand.

Development of medieval shogi 

Around the 13th century, the game of dai shogi, created by increasing the number of pieces in Heian shogi, was played, and the game of sho shogi, which adds the rook, bishop and drunken elephant from dai shogi to Heian shogi. Around the 14th century, as the rules of dai shogi had come to be considered too complicated, they were simplified, creating the game of chu shogi. Nevertheless, dai shogi was remembered, as known from a 1904 or 1905 woodcut by Kobayashi Kiyochika of two players of dai shogi. Chu shogi, like its parent dai shogi, contains many distinct pieces, such as the queen (identical with Western chess) and the lion (which moves like a king, but twice per turn, potentially being able to capture twice, among other idiosyncrasies). Chu shogi rivalled sho shogi in popularity until the introduction of drops in the latter, upon which standard shogi became ascendant, although chu shogi was still commonly played until about World War II, especially in Kyoto.

It is thought that the rules of modern shogi were fixed in the 16th century, when the drunken elephant was removed from the set of pieces.

As many as 174 shogi pieces have been excavated from the Ichijōdani Asakura Family Historic Ruins, which are thought to be from the latter half of the 16th century. Most of these pieces are pawns, but there is also one drunken elephant, leading to the hypothesis that in this period variations of shogi with and without the drunken elephant existed side by side.

One point of note in the history of this family of games is that it was during this period that the unique rule in Japanese shogi was developed whereby captured pieces (pieces in the hand) could be returned to the board. It is thought that the rule of pieces in the hand was proposed around the 16th century, but there is also a theory that this rule existed from the time of Heian sho shogi.

In the Edo period, more shogi variants with yet more pieces were proposed: tenjiku shogi, dai dai shogi, maka dai dai shogi, tai shogi (also called "dai shogi", but termed "tai shogi" to avoid confusing the two) and taikyoku shogi. However, it is thought that these forms of shogi were only played to a very limited extent.

Modern shogi 
Modern shogi (hon shogi), like go, was officially approved by the Tokugawa shogunate. The first O-hashi Shu-kei received fifty koku of rice and five men. In the Kan'ei period (around 1630), the  tournament, where games were played before a shōgun, was held. During the time of the eighth shōgun, Tokugawa Yoshimune, a system was established where the castle shogi tournament was held once a year on the 17th day on Kannazuki, and today the corresponding day in the modern calendar, November 17, has been designated Shogi Day.

The , who were the iemotos of shogi, were paid endowments. Over the reign of the shogunate, the title of meijin became a hereditary title of the Ōhashi family and one of its branches, and the Itō family. Today the title of meijin is still used, for the winner of the Meijin-sen competition. It became a tradition for shogi players inheriting the title of meijin to present a collection of shogi puzzles to the shogunate government.

A number of genius shogi players emerged who were not hereditary meijin.  was born in the mid-Edo period, and showed promise as a potential meijin, but died young and never inherited the title (which was bestowed on him posthumously). Kanju was a skilled composer of shogi puzzles, and even today his collection of puzzles  is well known as one of the greatest works of its kind. In the late Edo period,  came to prominence. More than a few count Sōho as one of the greatest shogi players in history.

Newspaper shogi and the formation of shogi associations 

After the fall of the Tokugawa shogunate, the three shogi families were no longer paid endowments, and the iemoto system in shogi lost its power. The lines of the three families ended, and the rank of meijin came to be bestowed by recommendation. However, it is thought that, with the exception of a handful of high-ranking players at the end of the 19th century, it was impossible to make a living as a professional shogi player during this period.

From around 1899, newspapers began to publish records of shogi matches, and high-ranking players formed alliances with the aim of having their games published. This was an early incarnation of the modern , founded in 1947.

The meijin system and title matches 

In 1935, Kinjiro Sekine stepped down from the rank of meijin, which then came to be conferred based on ability in the short term, rather than recommendation as before. The first  (known officially at the time as the ) was held over two years, with Yoshio Kimura (木村義雄) becoming the first Meijin in 1937. This was the start of the shogi title matches (see titleholder system).

The  tournament was started in 1953 and became a title match in 1983.

The ages of Ōyama and Habu 

After the Second World War, SCAP (occupational government mainly led by US) tried to eliminate all "feudal" factors from Japanese society and shogi was included in the possible list of items to be banned along with Bushido (philosophy of samurai) and other things. The reason for banning shogi for SCAP was its exceptional character as a board game seen in the usage of captured pieces. SCAP insisted that this could lead to the idea of prisoner abuse. But Kozo Masuda, then one of the top professional shogi players, when summoned to the SCAP headquarters for an investigation, criticized such understanding of shogi and insisted that it is not shogi but western chess that potentially contains the idea of prisoner abuse because it just kills the pieces of the opponent while shogi is rather democratic for giving prisoners the chance to get back into the game. Masuda also said that chess contradicts the ideal of gender equality in western society because the king shields itself behind the queen and runs away. Masuda's assertion is said to have eventually led to the exemption of shogi from the list of items to be banned.

However, another player later took these three titles from Masuda, and went on in 1959 to take the newly founded titles of Ōi and Kisei, to become a  - . Ōyama went on to defend these titles for six years, a golden age which became known as the "Ōyama age". Ōyama reached a total of 80 title holding periods, an unprecedented achievement at the time, when there were fewer titles than at present.

After the number of titles increased to seven in 1983, it was believed to be impossible to hold all of them at once, but in 1996, Yoshiharu Habu became the first , beginning an age known as the "Habu age". Since then, there has never been a time when he was without a title, and on July 5, 2012, Habu surpassed Ōyama's record, achieving a total of 81 title holding periods.

The birth of the women's game 
While there are both men and women among the ranks of professional shogi players, no woman player has yet won through the pro qualifier leagues (新進棋士奨励会 shinshin kishi shōreikai) to become an officially certified professional player (棋士 kishi). This served to slow the spread of the game among women, and to overcome the problem, the system of professional woman shogi players (女流棋士 joryū kishi) was introduced.

In 1966, Akiko Takojima (蛸島彰子) left the pro-qualifier leagues at the 1-dan level and became the first professional woman shogi player. However, at the time women's contests were not held, and so her only work as a professional was giving shogi lessons. In 1974, the first women's contest, the Women's Meijin Title Match (女流名人位戦 joryū meijin-sen), was held, which Takojima won, becoming the first woman meijin. 1974 is often considered to be the year in which women's shogi began, and indeed the Ladies Shogi Professional Organization (女流棋士会 joryū kishi kai) celebrates "anniversary parties" counting from this year.

As of 2014 there are more than 50 professional women players, and as well as the Universal Cup Women's Meijin Title Match　(ユニバーサル杯女流名人戦), there is also the Mynabi Women's Open (マイナビ女子オープン),　the Ricoh Cup Women's Ōza Title Match (リコー杯女流王座戦), the Women's Ōi Title Match (女流王位戦), the Kirishima Shuzo Cup Women's Ōshō Title Match (女流王将戦), the Ōyama Meijin Cup Kurashiki–Tōka Title Match (大山名人杯倉敷藤花戦), a total of six competitions. In addition, some standard professional tournaments has a women's section, in which the top women in each tournament compete.

Trends in the world of amateur shogi 
Shogi is also well known among the general public (amateurs). Two different rating systems based dan and kyu ranks are used, one for amateurs and one for professionals, with the highest ranks at amateur level, 4-dan or 5-dan, being equivalent to 6-kyu at the professional level. In the past, there were games between amateurs and professionals, but these were generally special match-ups organised by newspapers or magazines, or instructional games at events or shogi courses.

He later challenged Yasuharu Ōyama in the Meijin-sen, but did not manage to take the title of meijin from him.  was another shinken-shi, who beat one professional after another in special matches, and won the title of amateur meijin twice in a row, putting him ahead of the crowd in the amateur world. Although he never became a professional, after his death, television programmes and books telling his story were produced, and he now has more fans all over Japan than when he was alive.

In recent times, the gap in ability between strong amateurs and professionals continues to diminish, and there are even official professional tournaments in which those with the best results in  can take part.

The number of players who have left the pro qualifier leagues and gone on to have success as amateurs has increased.  retired from the qualifier leagues due to age restrictions, but went on to compete as an amateur in professional matches. Segawa submitted a petition requesting entry to the professional ranks to the Japan Shogi Association, and was granted exceptional permission to take the entrance exam. He is the first person to become a professional after retiring from the pro qualifier leagues.

Unless exceptional permission is granted, applicant normally need to have experience in the pro qualifier leagues, and cannot become professionals if they have retired from the leagues, but given the reforms taking place in the Association, it would be by no means unlikely if another Shōji Segawa were to appear.

The spread of shogi outside Japan 
The game of shogi has developed independently inside Japan, and its pieces are differentiated by Japanese characters written on them, factors which have impeded the spread of the game outside Japan. By way of comparison, the game of go has spread internationally for a combination of many reasons, including the facts that it originated in China, its rules are (more or less) unified at an international level, it is played using black and white stones, and that it does not resemble games unique to another country (as is the case with shogi, which is one of many games resembling chess).

An early, detailed description of the game in English appears in the Narrative of the Perry Expedition, in a report by Dr. Daniel S. Green who chanced upon the game a rainy night in Hakodate, and learned to play the game. The first shogi game played in the United States was in June 1860 in Philadelphia during the first visit to the country by a Japanese diplomatic delegation.

However, in the 1990s, efforts to make shogi popular outside Japan began in earnest. It has grown to be particularly popular in the People's Republic of China, and especially Shanghai. The January 2006 edition of  states that Shanghai has a shogi population of 120,000 people. The game has been relatively slow to spread to countries where Chinese characters are not in common use, although attempts have been made to aid adoption by replacing the names of pieces with symbols indicating how they move.

Changes in the shogi population 

However, none of these led to the birth of a "shogi boom", and in some cases unfavourable media reports accelerated the decline in the number of shogi fans.

The number of 10- to 19-year-olds playing go is said in the "Leisure White Paper" above to have increased due to the story "Hikaru no Go", serialised in Weekly Shōnen Jump. (The overall go population is decreasing.) However, the 2006 Leisure White Paper reports that go is most popular among those in their 60s, while shogi is most popular between those aged 10 to 19.

Japan Games.

Computer shogi 

Computers have steadily improved in playing shogi since the 1980s. Champion Habu estimated the strength of the 2006 world computer shogi champion Bonanza at the level of 2 dan shoreikai. Tools to help shogi programmers are Shogidokoro, annual computer tournaments and the Floodgate shogi server. The Japan Shogi Association restricts professionals from playing computers.

References 

 This article was translated from the history section of the Japanese Wikipedia shogi article, retrieved on September 17, 2006.

External links
 Japanese game Shogi: Czech Republic group which has developed a shogi set using symbols instead of Chinese characters.

Shogi